Reed is an unincorporated community in Greer County, Oklahoma, United States, located along State Highway 9 at North County Road 1840.  The ZIP Code is 73554.  The post office opened September 16, 1892.  Reed was said to have been named for the first postmaster, John Reed Graham.

Jay Buckle Springs, a locally famous watering hole on the National Register of Historic Places listings in Greer County, Oklahoma, is north of Reed just east of North County Road 1840, 500 feet north of its junction with East County Road 1420.  The Springs are named after the Jay Buckle Ranch which had its headquarters nearby.

Notable people
The Ponder brothers, Major League Baseball player Elmer and World War I Flying Ace William, were born in Reed and were of Cherokee descent. Film composer Marvin Hatley, best known for "Dance of the Cuckoos" which serves as Laurel and Hardy'''s theme song, was born in Reed.

Further reading
Shirk, George H. Oklahoma Place Names''. Norman: University of Oklahoma Press, 1987. .

References

Unincorporated communities in Greer County, Oklahoma
Unincorporated communities in Oklahoma